Stena Britannica, launched in 2009, is the second of two identical Ropax cruiseferries built by Wadan Yards in Warnemünde and nearby Wismar, Germany for Stena Line. Both ships operate across the southern North Sea between Harwich in Essex, England, and Hook of Holland, Netherlands, providing a twice daily service. The ships were specifically designed for this route.

Design and description
The engines are connected via two gearboxes to two controllable pitch propellers. The two rudders, one behind each propeller, are of the Becker flap type with twisted leading edges. Control of the bow while docking is by two tunnel thrusters. Heat from the main engines is also used to heat the ship.

Loading characteristics
The vehicle decks can be loaded on two levels from both the bow and stern on decks 3 and 5 and there are two-tier linkspans in both Harwich and Hook of Holland to accommodate the ship.

Construction and career
The ferries, then designated "RoPax 55" ferries, were originally ordered from the shipbuilders Waden Yards (subsequently subsumed into Nordic Yards Wismar) by Stena Line in 2006. The total value of the order amounted to approximately €400 million. Delays arose when Stena temporarily withdrew the order in response to economic difficulties being experienced by Waden Yards. After further negotiations the order was reinstated, but the new agreement included a price cut of 6% or approximately €24 million.

On the overnight crossing between Hook of Holland and Harwich on 17 January 2018, a fire broke out on one of the refrigerated lorries and subsequently spread to other lorries but did not breach the lorry decks. The vessel was subsequently taken to Schiedam and returned to service three days after the fire.

In popular culture
Stena Britannica is the focus of the Season 4 Episode 4 of the documentary TV show Mighty Ships. The episode first aired on 16 October 2011. During filming a problem with the locking pins of the bow watertight door meant that, for 72 hours / six crossings, loading and unloading could only be carried out via the upper ramp while engineers worked night and day to resolve the problem.

References

External links

2009 ships
Ferries of England
Ships built in Wismar
Britannica